New Cambridge Lofts is an eighteen-storey historic building located in Downtown Edmonton. Converted from an office building into condos, New Cambridge Lofts now contains over 200 residential and commercial condo units.

History

Completed in 1968, New Cambridge Lofts was designed by architectural firm Richards Berretti Jellenick, in the style of modern architecture. As an office building, New Cambridge Lofts was the corporate home of some of the city's largest law firms, and a large high-end restaurant and bar called Churchills. The existing tower is only one-half of the architects' original plan; another matching tower was supposed to be constructed to the east of the Cambridge, but was never completed.

In 2002, New Cambridge Lofts was converted into condominiums by Worthington Properties, who divided the former office tower into more than 200 residential and commercial units. In 2011, an architecturally significant penthouse was constructed using the shell of the building's former mechanical room. This project was featured in several architectural and design publications including Dwell (magazine), Western Living magazine, Avenue magazine and the Edmonton Journal.

Also notable are the renovations made to New Cambridge Lofts between 2012-2015, including artist-designed glass elevator interiors by Edmonton architect Sherri Shorten, and a large mural by Edmonton artist Jason Blower.

References

External links
Official Website

Office buildings completed in 1968
Buildings and structures in Edmonton
Skyscrapers in Edmonton
Residential skyscrapers in Canada